Finn Karlsen (born 1952 in Upernavik) is a Greenlandic politician. He represents the Atassut party.

His political career started in 1989, when he was elected to the municipal council of Narsaq Municipality. He took his seat in the Landstinget (Parliament) in 1995, and became Environment Minister in 2003, and Fishery and Food Minister in 2005.

In November 2007, he became Minister for Fisheries, Food, and Land Use.

References

External links
Profile at Nanoq.gl

Members of the Parliament of Greenland
1952 births
Living people
People from Upernavik
21st-century Danish politicians